Nimana is a village of Gulia Jats in the Jhajjar district of Haryana state, India, about  southwest of Badli village. Jats are a majority of the population. The major source of income is farming. The village has a literacy rate of about 60-70%. Nimana is known for holy celebration which is followed by a feast. People from 11 surrounding villages come for the holy celebrations and meal. Surrounding villages are Shond, Yakubpur and Pelpa.

References

Villages in Jhajjar district